Elections to the Wigan council were held on Thursday, 3 May 1984, with one third of the seats up for vote. Three wards – Abram, Hindley and Lightshaw – were unopposed, leaving only twenty one of the twenty four wards going to vote – a number not seen since 1975. Also of note was the re-emergence of a fourth party, in the way of persistent Communist candidate H. Kedward contesting Leigh Central after a three-year absence. The election itself seen a Labour gain in Orrell from the Conservatives, which cancelled out the simultaneous Alliance gain from Labour in Aspell-Standish, leaving their majority unchanged. Overall turnout slumped to 29.2%, the lowest level since the aforementioned 1975 election.

Election result

This result had the following consequences for the total number of seats on the Council after the elections:

Ward results

References

1984 English local elections
1984
1980s in Greater Manchester
May 1984 events in the United Kingdom